Faretta Radic is a Croatian fashion model. She was scouted in her home town in Croatia, when she was 17 years old, later that when she finished the Medical high school she started working as a professional model.

Career 
Faretta (who works mononymously) debuted as a Givenchy exclusive in 2016, in addition to opening for Victoria Beckham, Roberto Cavalli, Mugler, and closing Chloé; she also walked for designers including Saint Laurent, Céline, Miu Miu, Alexander McQueen, Chanel, Dior, Alberta Ferretti, Isabel Marant, Marc Jacobs, Versace, Prada, Alexander Wang, Michael Kors, Valentino, Fendi, and Ralph Lauren. W magazine chose her as one of the 15 breakout models of the spring 2017 fashion week, while Vogue stated,  "It's rare for a model to have the total package of a powerful walk, commanding presence, and next-level beauty, but somehow Faretta managed it."

Faretta has been the face of Ralph Lauren, and brands like Blumarine, Salvatore Ferragamo, Valentino, Zara, Lanvin, and Miu Miu.

She has appeared on the cover of Vogue Russia, Vogue Japan, British Vogue, Vogue Spain, and Vogue Germany. She has also appeared in W, Vogue, Vogue Italia, Vogue Paris, Harper's Bazaar, and V.

Videography

References 

Living people
Croatian female models
People from Trogir
The Society Management models
1998 births
Elite Model Management models